Matthew Strachan ( or ; 11 December 1970 – 8 September 2021) was an English composer and singer-songwriter.

His best known work is the music for British television game show Who Wants to Be a Millionaire? written with his father Keith, which would become a global franchise, and the BBC Radio 4 World War I drama series Home Front. He also wrote music to film and television productions such as Extract, The Detectives, Question Time, Winning Lines, jingles for several television commercials, and scores for stage musicals.

Biography

Strachan began writing songs as a teenager. His first professional job was to write five songs for the BBCTV drama Boogie Outlaws.

After training at Dartington College of Arts and Goldsmiths College, University of London, he worked as a soundtrack composer throughout the 1990s creating music for television, radio and theatre productions until concentrating on songwriting in Nashville, Tennessee where he collaborated with songwriters Don Henry, Tom Kimmel, J. Fred Knobloch, and Thom Schuyler.

Following two years in America he created score and lyrics for the stage musicals About Bill and Next Door's Baby. In 2012 he announced the creation of a comedy oratorio based on the life of the Coronation Street character Ken Barlow for inclusion in his live shows.

Strachan won twelve awards from the American Society of Composers, Authors and Publishers (ASCAP) and in 2012 received the ASCAP Hall of Fame Award in recognition of ten consecutive wins for the soundtrack of Who Wants to Be a Millionaire?

As a singer-songwriter Strachan was regarded as having a bittersweet style, often employing satire and characterisation to make political points about unusual subjects such as social networking and the media. As a composer of stage musicals he was noted for writing songs with a complete narrative arc.

A new studio album by Matthew Strachan titled Serious Men was released by Lonely Goat Records in August 2016.

He was also the creator of the comic fictional 1970s composer Klaus Harmony. In March 2017 Simon & Schuster announced that it would be publishing a series of crime fiction books co-written by Strachan and his wife, Bernadette Strachan.

In October 2020, he appeared at Lavender Hill Magistrates Court in London, charged with one count of arson.

On 22 September 2021, the BBC reported that Strachan had died at his home in Twickenham, London, at the age of 50.

Discography
Albums

A Quiet Place I've Waited, Nono Records (2017)
 Serious Men, Lonely Goat Records (2016)
 Perfect World Now Possible, Nono Records (2014)
 Live at the St James Theatre, Nono Records (2013)
 25 Year Songbook Part II, Nono Records (2012)
 25 Year Songbook, Nono Records (2012)
 37203, Nono Records (2004)
 Even Warren Beatty (with Tim Whitnall), Nono Records (2002)
 Save The King's Head, Nono Records (2000)
 Fallen Angels, Nono Records (1999)
 The Rock Serious Electric Roadshow, Nono Records (1993)

Compilations
 Speed Limit Monkey, Nono Records (2008)
 Flot Some, Jet Some, Nono Records (2008)

Covered by other artists

 I Never Left You at All – J. Fred Knobloch, Hear Here, J. Fred Knobloch Music, (2015)
 Journeyman – Catherine Porter, single, Nono Records, (2011)
 Any More of You – Catherine Porter, 37203, Nono Records, (2004)
 Love is Enough – J. Fred Knobloch, 37203, Nono Records, (2004)
 The Note – Don Henry, 37203, Nono Records, (2004)
 Mama 'n' Them – J. Fred Knobloch, single, Nono Records, (2008)
 Just Because I Want To – Tommy Blaize, Even Warren Beatty, Nono Records, (2008)

Soundtracks and Musicals

 As Is & Passing By, Nessus Records (2013)
 About Bill, Nessus Records (2011)
 Music for Theatre, Nessus Records (2011)
 Silk, Nessus Records (2009)
 Next Door's Baby, Nessus Records (2006)
 Who Wants to Be a Millionaire? – Soundtrack, Celador Records (2000)
 Who Wants to Be a Millionaire? – Interactive Game, Sony PlayStation, Disney Interactive (2000)
 Toy Story Sing Along, Disney (1997)

A.k.a Klaus Harmony

 Oeuvre Cinq, HarmonSink (2010)
 Oeuvre 4, HarmonSink (2009)
 Oeuvre Derde, HarmonSink (2008)
 Oeuvre Zwei, HarmonSink (2007)
 Oeuvre I, HarmonSink (2006)

Music for motion pictures
 Mostly Dead, UkFilm.co
 Love Is a Four Letter Word Worth Seven Points, Boxfly Media, (2015)
 In Limbo, Nine Ladies Films, (2015)

Music featured in motion pictures
 Extract, Composer – Wundercrotchen, Miramax Films, (2009)
 Slumdog Millionaire, Composer – Who Wants to Be a Millionaire?, Fox Searchlight, (2008)
 Millions, Composer – Who Wants to Be a Millionaire?, Fox Searchlight, (2004)
 Celador Films Theme, Celador Films
 About a Boy, Composer – Who Wants to Be a Millionaire?, Universal Pictures, (2002)
 A Kind of Hush, Composer/lyricist – Confusions, First Film Company/Metrodome, (1998)

Music for stage

 Twitstorm, Park Theatre (London)
 The Roundabout, Park Theatre (London)/59E59 Theaters, New York
 Acorn, Courtyard Theatre, London
 The Man Called Monkhouse, Edinburgh Fringe/National Tour
 As Is, Trafalgar Studios
 Passing By, Tristan Bates Theatre
 As Is, Finborough Theatre
 Yours for the Asking, Orange Tree Theatre
 About Bill, Landor Theatre
 Hungry Ghosts, Orange Tree Theatre
 The Promise, Orange Tree Theatre
 The Making of Moo, Orange Tree Theatre
 Silk, Workshopped at the Orange Tree Theatre
 Last Train to Nibroc, Orange Tree Theatre
 Next Door's Baby, Orange Tree Theatre
 Happy Birthday Dear Alice, Orange Tree Theatre
 The Lodger, Theatre Royal, Windsor
 The Fly, Old Fire Station Theatre, Oxford
 Mad Dog Killer Leper Fiend, Man in the Moon Theatre
 Simpleton of the Unexpected Isles, Orange Tree Theatre
 The Good Woman of Setzuan, Orange Tree Theatre

Music for television and radio

 Home Front, composer, BBC Radio 4
 Money, Composer Finding Schuyler & Can You See me From Over There? BBC2
 Who Wants to Be a Millionaire? 10th Anniversary American Broadcasting Company
 Super Millionaire American Broadcasting Company
 Sketch Show Story BBC1
 Who Wants to Be a Millionaire?, Celador Productions, ITV, American Broadcasting Company
 Winning Lines, Celador Productions, CBS, BBC
 Ben-Hur (syndicated US Radio Drama) Focus on the Family
 Britain's Brainiest, Celador Productions, International
 Question Time, Mentorn Films, BBC
 Car Wars, Mentorn Films, BBC
 The Gemini Apes, BBC Radio 4
 Mind the Gap ITV
 Nobblers, BBC Radio 2
 The Hypnotic World of Paul McKenna, Celador Productions, ITV
 Diggin' the Dancing Queens BBC
 The Detectives, Celador Productions, BBC
 Canned Carrott, Celador Productions, BBC
 The Jasper Carrott Trial, Celador Productions, BBC
 Children's Ward, Granada Television, ITV
 World Sport Esprit, TWI, International
 Legends of Wimbledon, TWI, International
 Scratchy and Co, Mentorn Films, ITV
 Boogie Outlaws'' BBC

Awards

 ASCAP Awards, Hall of Fame Award, 2012, London
 ASCAP Awards, US TV Theme, 2011, London
 ASCAP Awards, US TV Theme, 2010, London
 ASCAP Awards, US TV Theme, 2009, London
 ASCAP Awards, US TV Theme, 2008, London
 ASCAP Awards, US TV Theme, 2007, London
 ASCAP Awards, US TV Theme, 2006, London
 ASCAP Awards, US TV Theme, 2005, London
 ASCAP Awards, US TV Theme, 2004, London
 ASCAP 17th Annual Film & TV Awards, Top TV Theme, 2002, Los Angeles
 ASCAP 16th Annual Film & TV Awards, Top TV Theme, 2001, Los Angeles
 ASCAP Awards, US TV Theme, 2000, London

References

External links
 Official website
 
 
 Matthew Strachan at BBC Music
 Just Grand Music Catalogue website
 MusicBrainz entry
 BASCA entry

1970 births
2021 deaths
English male singer-songwriters
English television composers
English male composers
English musical theatre composers
English musical theatre lyricists
English lyricists
English male novelists
Who Wants to Be a Millionaire?
Musicians from London
Alumni of Goldsmiths, University of London
21st-century English singers
21st-century British male singers